Dublin, as the capital city of Ireland and the largest city in Ireland, has produced many noted artists, entertainers, politicians and businesspeople. Also include are people affiliated with Dublin before the creation of the Republic of Ireland.

List of Dublin people

Writers, composers and philosophers

Sebastian Barry – playwright
Samuel Beckett – novelist, playwright, theatre director, poet and Nobel laureate
Brendan Behan – poet, short story writer novelist, playwright
George Berkeley – empiricist philosopher
Jon Berkeley – writer
Maeve Binchy – writer
Dermot Bolger – writer
Elizabeth Bowen – writer
Clare Boylan – writer
Christy Brown – writer
John Byrne – columnist, cartoonist
Austin Clarke – poet, novelist, dramatist
Marita Conlon-McKenna – children's author
Annie Jessy Curwen – author
Donnacha Dennehy – composer
Roddy Doyle – writer
Anne Enright – writer
Dave Fanning – rock journalist
John Field – pianist, composer, wrote the first nocturnes
Oliver Goldsmith – writer
Annie French Hector – novelist
Pat Ingoldsby – poet
James Joyce – author, poet
Trevor Joyce – poet
Jane Jowitt – poet, memoirist
Patrick Kavanagh – poet and novelist
Brendan Kehoe – software developer, author
Sheridan Le Fanu – novelist
James Clarence Mangan – poet
Columba Marmion – monk
Aidan Mathews – poet, dramatist, novelist
David McSavage – comedy writer
Thomas Moore – poet
Vincent O'Brien – composer
Seán O'Casey – playwright, memorist
John O'Keeffe – writer
Fintan O'Toole – journalist and political commentator
George William Russell – writer, editor, critic, poet, painter and theosophist
George Bernard Shaw – novelist, playwright and Nobel laureate
Ronan Sheehan – novelist, short story writer, essayist
Frances Sheridan – novelist
Richard Brinsley Sheridan – playwright
Annie P. Smithson – novelist
Charles Villiers Stanford – composer
Robert Prescott Stewart – composer
Bram Stoker – novelist
Jonathan Swift – writer, satirist
John Millington Synge – playwright
Oscar Wilde – playwright, author, poet
Maev-Ann Wren – writer
William Butler Yeats – poet, playwright and Nobel laureate
Zozimus (Michael Moran) – poet

Entertainers

Eamonn Andrews – radio and television presenter
Caitriona Balfe – actress (Outlander)
Bono – lead singer with U2 and campaigner on world debt
Wilfred Brambell – actor (Steptoe & Son)
Ronan Browne – musician
Gabriel Byrne – actor
Gay Byrne – former presenter of The Late Late Show, the world's second longest-running chat show
Nicky Byrne – singer in Westlife
Luke Cheevers – traditional singer, song collector and songwriter
Dean Clark – actor
Cathy Davey – singer-songwriter 
Chris De Burgh – musician
Alison Doody – actress
Craig Doyle – television and radio presenter
Ronnie Drew – musician
The Dubliners – folk and ballad group (Luke Kelly, Ronnie Drew, Barnie McKenna, John Sheahan)
Joe Duffy – broadcaster
Elizabeth Rebecca Edwin – stage actress
Joe Elliott – lead singer of Def Leppard
Siobhan Fahey – singer-songwriter, Bananarama and Shakespears Sister
Colin Farrell – actor
Marian Finucane – broadcaster
Barry Fitzgerald – actor
Brenda Fricker – actress
Michael Gambon – actor
Orla Gartland – singer-songwriter, musician
Stephen Gately – singer
Bob Geldof – The Boomtown Rats lead singer; Live Aid organiser
Aidan Gillen – actor (Game of Thrones)
Brian Gleeson – actor
Brendan Gleeson – actor
Domhnall Gleeson – actor
John & Edward Grimes – singing twins nicknamed "Jedward"
Glen Hansard – lead singer of The Frames; actor
Neasa Hardiman – director
C. Morton Horne – musical comedy actor
Siva Kaneswaran – member of boy band The Wanted
Ronan Keating – singer
Lisa Kelly – singer
Luke Kelly – musician
Pat Kenny – former presenter of The Late Late Show, the world's longest-running chat show
Lisa Lambe Laois actress and singer
Phil Lynott – from the band Thin Lizzy
Annie Mac – DJ and presenter
Edwin Maxwell – actor
Brian McFadden – former singer in Westlife
Kitty McShane – actor/singer who appeared in the Old Mother Riley films with Arthur Lucan
Jonathan Rhys Meyers – actor
Larry Mullen – drummer for U2
Samantha Mumba – singer, actress
Aubrey Murphy – violinist
Jonathon Ng – musician, under the alias EDEN
Colm Ó Cíosóig – musician, drummer of My Bloody Valentine
Sinéad O'Connor – singer
Jimmy O'Dea – actor and comedian
Danny O'Donoghue – lead singer for The Script
Maureen O'Hara – actress
Liam Ó Maonlaí – singer, bodhrán player; member of Hothouse Flowers
Maureen O'Sullivan – actress
Gerard Parkes – actor; moved with his family to Canada
Noel Purcell – actor, singer
Glenn Quinn – actor
Gerry Ryan – television presenter
Andrew Scott – actor (Sherlock)
Thomas Sheridan – actor
Kevin Shields – musician, vocalist and guitarist of My Bloody Valentine
Carly Smithson – singer, appeared on American Idol; lead singer of We Are the Fallen
Ronan Tynan – inspirational tenor
Bernie Tormé – guitarist
Ryan Tubridy – current presenter of The Late Late Show, the world's longest-running chat show
Aidan Turner – actor (The Hobbit, Being Human, Poldark)
Louis Walsh – judge of X-Factor

Politicians and leaders

Bertie Ahern – former Taoiseach
John Binns – politician
Edmund Burke – father of modern conservatism
Timothy Burns – Lieutenant Governor of Wisconsin
Edward Carson – Leader of Irish Unionism and British Cabinet minister
James Caulfeild, 1st Earl of Charlemont – statesman
George Colley – politician
Harry Colley – politician
Liam Cosgrave – former Taoiseach
Hans Crocker – Mayor of Milwaukee, Wisconsin
Andrew Cunningham – Admiral of the Fleet, Royal Navy 
Thomas Davis – U.S. Representative for Rhode Island
Robert Emmet – Nationalist
Garret FitzGerald – former Taoiseach
Henry Flood – statesman
Philip France – politician
Henry Grattan – politician and member of the Irish house of commons
Seán Lemass – Taoiseach from 1959 to 1966
Jim Mitchell – youngest Lord Mayor of Dublin (aged 29)
James Napper Tandy – revolutionary
J. C. Neville – Wisconsin State Assemblyman
Thomas O'Neill – Wisconsin State Assemblyman
Patrick Pearse – writer, leader of the Easter Rising
William Petty – British Prime Minister
John Reed – immigrant to California; prominent in early California settlement
Richard Saul – aviator and commander in the Battle of Britain
Leo Varadkar – former Taoiseach
Theobald Wolfe Tone – revolutionary, leader of the United Irishmen
Arthur Wellesley – British Prime Minister
William Whitshed – politician

Soldiers

Hugh Burgoyne – recipient of the Victoria Cross
Thomas Byrne – recipient of the Victoria Cross
Thomas Crean – recipient of the Victoria Cross and rugby union international
Christian Davies – trooper of the Royal Scots Greys
John Farrell – recipient of the Victoria Cross
George Forrest – recipient of the Victoria Cross
Peter Gill – recipient of the Victoria Cross
Patrick Graham – recipient of the Victoria Cross
James Jackman – recipient of the Victoria Cross
Henry Jones – recipient of the Victoria Cross
Richard Keatinge – recipient of the Victoria Cross
James Kenny – recipient of the Victoria Cross
Harry Lyster – recipient of the Victoria Cross
William Manley – recipient of the Victoria Cross
Arthur Moore – recipient of the Victoria Cross
Thomas Murphy – recipient of the Victoria Cross
Claude Nunney – recipient of the Victoria Cross
Edmund O'Toole – recipient of the Victoria Cross
Hamilton Reed – recipient of the Victoria Cross
James Henry Reynolds – recipient of the Victoria Cross
Robert Rogers – recipient of the Victoria Cross
Frederick Smith – recipient of the Victoria Cross
Philip Smith – recipient of the Victoria Cross

Sport 

Jacko Barry – darts player
Liam Brady – former Arsenal, Juventus and Republic of Ireland footballer
Jason Byrne – Championship and Irish international footballer
Christy Canavan – former footballer
Stephen Carr – Premiership and Irish international footballer
Willie Carrick – footballer
Eamonn Coghlan – World Championship-winning athlete
Steve Collins – World Championship-winning boxer
Rachel Costello –  camogie player
Stephen Dawson – former Leicester and under-21 Republic of Ireland footballer
Ronnie Delaney – Olympic gold medalist
Ken Doherty – winner of World Snooker Championship
Dan Donnelly – first Irish-born heavyweight boxing champion
Damien Duff – former Premiership and Irish international footballer
Bernard Dunne – retired boxer; former WBA Super Bantamweight World Champion and European Super Bantamweight Champion
Willo Flood – SPL and Championship footballer
Johnny Giles – former Leeds United and Republic of Ireland footballer
Pádraig Harrington – Ryder Cup-winning golfer
Edmund Joyce – Middlesex and Ireland cricketer
Robbie Keane – Major League Soccer and Irish international footballer
Joe Lawless – Irish soccer player
Becky Lynch – WWE wrestler/diva
Paul McGinley – Ryder Cup-winning golfer
Mick McGowan – darts player
Conor McGregor – UFC fighter; former featherweight and lightweight champion, and the first fighter to hold two belts simultaneously
Jim McQuillan – darts player
Jason Molins – cricketer
Kevin Moran – former All Ireland-winning Dublin Gaelic footballer, Manchester United and Republic of Ireland footballer
Eoin Morgan – former Ireland cricket team player who currently plays for Middlesex County Cricket Club and England
Mark Nulty – Irish cricketer
Kevin O'Brien – Irish cricketer
Niall O'Brien – Northamptonshire and Ireland cricketer
Cian O'Connor – equestrian
Brian O'Driscoll – former Leinster, Ireland and Lions rugby player
Pat O'Toole – former professional footballer
Niall Quinn – former footballer for Arsenal, Sunderland and Republic of Ireland
Charlie Redmond – Dublin footballer
Stephen Roche – Tour de France-winning cyclist
Alan Ruddock – introduced Karate and Aikido to Ireland; 6th dan Aikidoka
Brian Shawe-Taylor – racing driver
Sheamus – WWE wrestler, real name Stephen Farrelly 
Jason Sherlock – Dublin footballer
Michelle Smith – Olympic gold (3) and bronze (1) medal-winning swimmer
Frank Stapleton – former Arsenal, Manchester United and Republic of Ireland footballer
Jim Stynes – Australian rules footballer
Ronnie Whelan – former Liverpool and Republic of Ireland footballer

Other

Francis Bacon – painter
René Bull – illustrator and war artist
Harry Clarke – stained glass artist
Veronica Guerin – journalist
Hugh Hamilton – bishop
William Rowan Hamilton – mathematician
William Edwin Hamilton – civil engineer
Francis Hardy – barrister
Josephine Heffernan – Irish-American nurse in WWI
Rex Ingram – film director
Mainie Jellett – painter
Alan Joyce – CEO of Qantas Airways Limited
Robert Mallet – geophysicist, father of seismology
Leonard McNally – barrister
David McWilliams – writer, presenter and economist
Sharon Ní Bheoláin – journalist
William Orpen – painter
Peter Rice – engineer
Sean Scully – painter
Louise O'Sullivan – founder and CEO of Anam Technologies
Edward Hutchinson Synge – physicist
John Lighton Synge – mathematician
William Tisdall – priest
Willie Walsh – CEO of British Airways
Una Watters – artist and librarian

See also
List of University of Dublin people
List of University College Dublin people
List of Dublin City University people
List of Irish people
:Category:People from County Dublin

References

Dublin
 
People